Hrastovec v Slovenskih Goricah is a settlement in the Slovene Hills in the Municipality of Lenart in northeastern Slovenia. The area is part of the traditional region of Styria. It is now included in the Drava Statistical Region.

Hrastovec Castle

The dominant landmark in the settlement is Hrastovec Castle. It is a castle dating to the early 13th century with various later stages. It has a number of well-preserved Baroque features, including a painted chapel. It is one of the largest surviving castles in Slovenia. It houses a psychiatric hospital.

After World War II, the castle was the site of an internment camp run by the Yugoslav secret police for people accused of collaborating with the Germans.

References

External links

Hrastovec v Slovenskih Goricah on Geopedia

Populated places in the Municipality of Lenart